Oleksiy Omel'chenko (born 20 June 1989, in Soviet Union) is a professional Ukrainian football striker.

Career
He played for Ukrainian Premier League club FC Karpaty Lviv. He is the product of the Karpaty Lviv Youth School System.

External links
Website Karpaty Profile
Profile on EUFO
Profile on Football Squads

1989 births
Living people
Sportspeople from Lviv
Ukrainian footballers
Ukraine student international footballers
Ukrainian expatriate footballers
Expatriate footballers in the Czech Republic
FC Karpaty Lviv players
FC Karpaty-2 Lviv players
FC Prykarpattia Ivano-Frankivsk (2004) players
FC Stal Kamianske players
SCC Demnya players
FC Rukh Lviv players
FC Lviv players
Association football forwards